Grevie och Beden (or Beden-Grevie) is a locality situated in Staffanstorp Municipality, Skåne County, Sweden with 241 inhabitants in 2010.

References 

Populated places in Skåne County
Populated places in Staffanstorp Municipality